Angelos Stamatopoulos (born 23 April 1997) is a Greek professional footballer who plays as a goalkeeper.

References

1997 births
Living people
Super League Greece players
Football League (Greece) players
Apollon Smyrnis F.C. players
Kozani F.C. players
Olympiacos F.C. players
Panetolikos F.C. players
A.E. Sparta P.A.E. players
Nafpaktiakos Asteras F.C. players
Diagoras F.C. players
Egaleo F.C. players
Association football goalkeepers
Footballers from Athens
Greek footballers